Ricardo Confessori (born January 25, 1969) is a Brazilian drummer and a former member of the Brazilian power metal band Angra.

After leaving the Brazilian thrash metal band Korzus, Confessori was invited for assume the post of drummer of Angra, after the recording of the album Angels Cry.

In 2000, Confessori left Angra with singer Andre Matos and bassist Luis Mariutti to form the band Shaman together with guitarist Hugo Mariutti. Shaman released three albums with this line-up: Ritual (2002); RituAlive (live album, released in CD and DVD in 2003); and Reason, in 2005. After the second album, Confessori and Matos had some creative differences. Confessori owned the Shaman name resulting in the other members leaving the band. In 2009, Confessori returned to Angra, replacing the drummer Aquiles Priester. In 2014 it was announced that he had once again left the band.

In 2016, he was announced as the new drummer for folk metal band Tierramystica. He also served as a guest/live musician for parodic heavy metal band Massacration, under the pseudonym "El Perro Loco", from 2016 to 2022.

Ricardo Confessori endorses: RMV drums and drumheads, Drum Shop USA snares, Zildjian cymbals and Vic Firth drumsticks.

Discography
Angra
 Holy Land (1996)
 Fireworks (1998)
 Aqua (2010)

Shaman
 Ritual (2002)
 RituAlive (2003)
 Reason (2005)
 Immortal (2007)
 Origins (2010)
 Rescue (2022)

Massacration
 Live Metal Espancation (2017)

References 

1969 births
Living people
Angra (band) members
Brazilian heavy metal drummers
Brazilian people of Italian descent
Musicians from São Paulo
Shaman (band) members